Mark Sawers is a Canadian film director and writer. Best known for his feature films Camera Shy and No Men Beyond This Point, he is also a four-time Genie Award nominee for Best Live Action Short Drama for his films Stroke at the 13th Genie Awards, Hate Mail at the 14th Genie Awards, Shoes Off! at the 19th Genie Awards and Lonesome Joe at the 24th Genie Awards.

Shoes Off also won the Canal+ Award at the 1999 Cannes Film Festival.

As a television director, his credits have included segments of The Kids in the Hall, and episodes of Alienated, Alice, I Think, About a Girl, The Assistants, Mr. Young and Anticlimax.

From Vancouver, British Columbia, Sawers is a graduate of the University of British Columbia.

Filmography
Absolute Trash: A Recycling Story - 1980
The Middle Child - 1989
Stroke - 1992 
Hate Mail - 1993 
Shoes Off! - 1998
Lonesome Joe - 2002
Exposed - 2010
Camera Shy - 2012
No Men Beyond This Point - 2015
Call from Josie - 2017

References

External links

Canadian television directors
Canadian male screenwriters
Film directors from Vancouver
Writers from Vancouver
University of British Columbia alumni
Living people
Year of birth missing (living people)